Hortense Clémentine Tanvet (19 November 1880 -13 February 1981) was a French sculptor.

Biography
Hortense Clémentine Tanvet was born in Mésanger on 19 November 1880 and died in Nantes on 13 February 1981. In 1901 she enrolled at the Nantes École des Beaux-Arts and later continued his studies in Paris.

Tanvet's recorded works are:

Monument to Léon Séché
This monument is located in Ancenis in the boulevard Léon-Séché and dates to 1925. It was in 1922 that Charles Le Goffic headed a committee to organise a monument in Ancenis to honour Léon Séché and Hortense Tanvet was commissioned to execute the sculptural content involved. The work was in bronze and in 1942, during the German occupation, it was requisitioned and melted down so that the metal could be re-used. In 1957 the sculpture was renewed and placed in its present location. The inscription  reads

Monument to Caroline Angebert
This monument is located in Dunkerque and involves a bronze medallion and bust by Tanvet. The casting was by the Paris foundry Montagutelli Frères and the inauguration took place on 28 October 1913. The bust is of Angebert, a great friend of Lamartine who is depicted on the medallion.

Guidel War Memorial
This 1921 memorial in Guidel has a relief sculpture by Tanvet depicting a wounded soldier lying on the ground and looking up towards an angel.

Plouescat War Memorial
This memorial stands in Plouescat's cemetery attached to the wall of the chapel. It was erected in 1922. Three types of stone were used, each having different colours: the grey granite of Quimper, the rose granite of Aber-Ildut and the black stone from Kersanton. The names of 120 men of Plouescat who gave their lives in the 1914-1918 war are listed, as well as 78 killed in the 1939-1945 war. A Victor Hugo poem is inscribed on the monument:

References

1880 births
1981 deaths
French centenarians
20th-century French sculptors
Sculptors from Brittany
20th-century French women artists
Women centenarians